Christopher Allan Gratton (born July 5, 1975) is a Canadian former professional ice hockey player who last played with the Columbus Blue Jackets of the National Hockey League (NHL). He is the cousin of Josh Gratton, who had also briefly played in the NHL as a member of the Philadelphia Flyers and the Phoenix Coyotes.

Early life
Gratton's father coached him for one season during his youth.

Playing career

Junior hockey 
Gratton played his minor hockey in his hometown of Brantford, Ontario, playing for such programs as the Brantford Nodrofsky Steelers (the same program Wayne Gretzky played in many years earlier) and the Brantford CKPC Knights. As a 15-year-old, he played one season with the Jr B Brantford Classics.

In 1991, Gratton was selected third overall in the OHL Priority Selection by the Kingston Frontenacs. After his rookie year in the OHL, Gratton received the Emms Family Award as rookie of the year. In 1993, he was selected third overall in the NHL Draft by the Tampa Bay Lightning.

Tampa Bay Lightning 
Gratton made his NHL debut for the Lightning on October 6, 1993, against the New Jersey Devils. He recorded his first career point (a powerplay assist on a Bob Beers goal) in his second game against the New York Rangers the next night. He scored his first career goal against Robb Stauber of the Los Angeles Kings in a 4–3 Lightning loss on October 20, 1993

Philadelphia Flyers 
In 1997, Gratton signed with the Philadelphia Flyers as a free agent after four seasons with the Lightning, earning a $9 million signing bonus. In 1997–98, Gratton matched his career-high of 62 points and recorded a career-best plus/minus rating of +11. Gratton was traded back to Tampa Bay the next season.

Second stint with Lightning 
Gratton served as Tampa Bay's captain during the 1999–2000 season until his trade in March, 2000, when Tampa Bay traded Gratton to the Buffalo Sabres.

Buffalo Sabres 

Gratton arrived in Buffalo along with Doug Gilmour near the trade deadline of the 1999-2000 NHL season. Buffalo added both with the hope that they could revive the team's fortunes and propel them to the playoffs. The Sabres eventually did qualify for the playoffs, but bowed out in five games to the Philadelphia Flyers in the first round.

Gratton eventually played three seasons with the Sabres, scoring at least 15 goals in each year. In his first full season with Buffalo, he recorded 19 goals and again helped the Sabres reach the playoffs. He notched five goals in helping the Sabres beat the Flyers in the first round, though his production dipped to a single goal in the next round against the Pittsburgh Penguins as the Sabres were eliminated in seven games.

Gratton would still be productive in his final two years in Buffalo, though the team failed to reach the post-season. His final year in Buffalo was his most productive, reaching 44 points and 15 goals in 66 games, good enough for second in team scoring behind Miroslav Satan.

Phoenix Coyotes 
Gratton would play for the Sabres until March 2003, when the Sabres traded him to the Phoenix Coyotes for Daniel Briere. One year later on March 9, 2004, Phoenix traded Gratton (along with Ossi Väänänen and a second-round draft pick, ultimately used to select Paul Stastny) in the 2005 NHL Entry Draft to the Colorado Avalanche in exchange for Derek Morris and Keith Ballard.

Florida Panthers 
After the 2004–05 NHL lockout, Gratton signed a one-year contract with the Florida Panthers. Gratton signed a two-year contract extension with the Panthers in March 2006. He was traded back to the Tampa Bay Lightning again on June 13, 2007, in exchange for a second-round draft pick (used to select Jacob Markström).

Return to Tampa Bay Lightning 
During the 2007–08 season, Gratton scored 21 points in 60 games before tearing the acetabular labrum in his left hip which required season-ending surgery. Gratton re-signed with the Lightning for the 2008–09 season but was waived in December and was assigned to Tampa Bay's American Hockey League (AHL) affiliate, the Norfolk Admirals.

Columbus Blue Jackets 
Gratton was claimed off of re-entry waivers on February 21, 2009, by the Columbus Blue Jackets. He played in six games for Columbus, recording an assist, before retiring in 2009.

Personal life 
Gratton lives in Ancaster, Ontario and has one son, Zachary, who plays hockey, and three daughters. He has coached his son in minor hockey, first in house league in Ancaster, then for AA and eventually with the Hamilton AAA Jr. Bulldogs' bantam team.

Gratton is co-owner of the Florida Jr. Blades Organization (in the 29-team Empire Junior Hockey League).

Career statistics

Regular season and playoffs

International

See also
List of NHL players who have signed offer sheets
List of NHL players with 1000 games played

References

External links
 

1975 births
Buffalo Sabres players
Canadian ice hockey centres
Colorado Avalanche players
Columbus Blue Jackets players
Florida Panthers players
Kingston Frontenacs players
Living people
National Hockey League first-round draft picks
Norfolk Admirals players
Philadelphia Flyers players
Phoenix Coyotes players
Tampa Bay Lightning draft picks
Tampa Bay Lightning players
Ice hockey people from Ontario
Sportspeople from Brantford